American Heritage Schools (AHS, Heritage) are a pair of private, college preparatory, independent, nonsectarian, and co-educational day schools for grades Pre-K 3 through 12. The two campuses together teach 4,200 students and are located in the United States in Plantation, Florida, a suburb just west of Fort Lauderdale in Broward County, and in Delray Beach, Florida, a city just north of Boca Raton in southern Palm Beach County.

History 

The school was first established by William R. Laurie in 1965. Heritage opened its first campus in 1971 at 800 South Federal Highway in Fort Lauderdale, Florida. In 1973, the school opened a second campus at 1725 Monroe St. in Hollywood, Florida. In 1975, Laurie opened a third campus located at 12200 W. Broward Boulevard in Plantation, Florida. The three campuses were later consolidated into the Broward Campus. Since moving to the  property, the campus has expanded several times.

Heritage is a tuition-only school that neither asks for nor accepts donations. The school is managed by educators, and has no governing board. Children of faculty and staff receive full tuition at the school. In January 1999, American Heritage Schools acquired All-Star Academy in Delray Beach, Florida, establishing it as the school's second campus, Palm Beach Campus.

Campuses 
American Heritage has two  campuses: the Broward campus in Plantation and the Palm Beach campus in Delray Beach. Both house grades Pre-K 3 through 12 grade. Facilities include investigative science labs headed by Ph.D. research scientists, engineering and robotics labs, media centers, a mock courtroom, outdoor environmental classrooms with a certified wildlife habitat, an arts center, a 25-yard short course pool, sports fields, and courtyards. The Center for Fine Arts on the Broward Campus includes several performance spaces including an 800-seat main stage. In March 2019, American Heritage opened the Science Research, Engineering, and Robotics building on the Palm Beach Campus. The research center includes two biosafety level 2 laboratories: a chemistry lab and a biology lab. Also home to the pre-engineering department, the building includes a robotics lab with several 3D printers.

Like the South Florida area, students at American Heritage come from diverse backgrounds. About 70 countries are represented among the student body.

The current president of American Heritage School is Dr. Douglas R. Laurie, M.Ed., D.C., son of founder William R. Laurie.

Academics 
In the Lower School, advanced courses are offered, including the Stanford University math program for accelerated math students in grades 4–6. Fifteen elective classes are integrated into all students' daily schedules. The Upper School offers more than 300 courses, which includes 133 honors courses, 29 Advanced Placement (AP) courses, and 75 fine arts classes. In 2015, AHS was one of five schools in the nation with three students with perfect scores in an AP exam.

The Medical Professions program offers students a pre-med track including advanced courses in Genetics, Medical Terminology, and Pathology. American Heritage also offers five other pre-professional programs which include business and entrepreneurship, pre-law, pre-engineering, biomedical engineering and computer science.

In 2016, 50 students at AHS were named semifinalists to the National Merit Scholarship Program, the most in Florida and ninth in the nation. In September 2018, 24 students on the Delray Beach campus and 70 students on the Plantation campus were named semifinalists to the 2019 National Merit Scholarship. The class of 2022 on the Plantation campus had 77 National Merit finalists and semifinalists. There were also 21 Presidential Scholar candidates from the class of 2022 on the Plantation campus. The school also has a competitive math team and a chapter of the Mu Alpha Theta mathematics honor society. Heritage's competitive mock trial team has won several state titles.

Athletics 
As of 2018, Heritage's Patriots football team has won three out of its last five state championship titles and ended the undefeated 2017 season with a 27-game winning streak. The team has won the Florida High School Athletic Association's Class 5A Football Championships in 2013, 2016, and 2017. The 2018 Patriots included two cornerbacks rated five stars by 247Sports.com, Patrick Surtain II and Tyson Campbell, both selected in the 2021 NFL Draft. Together with two other four-star prospects from American Heritage, they were collectively referred to as the "AH4".

The school's second team on the Palm Beach Campus, the Stallions, have won the Class 1A Football Championships in 2007 and 2009, as well as the Class 3A Championship in 2011.

American Heritage also has athletics programs for bowling, baseball, cheerleading, golf, ice hockey, lacrosse, soccer, softball, swimming, tennis, track and field, volleyball, weightlifting, and wrestling.

Controversy
In late 2018, the school faced criticism for expelling a student at the Plantation campus for allegedly verbally attacking a basketball coach. An attorney for the family of the expelled student claimed the expulsion and the incident that led to it were partly the result of either racial or socioeconomic discrimination by school staff. In response, basketball player Dwyane Wade and actress Gabrielle Union expressed support for the expelled student and claimed their children were also harassed by the same basketball coach in separate incidents.

Notable Faculty and Staff 
Patrick Surtain Sr. – professional football cornerback
Jeff Dellenbach - professional football center

Notable alumni 

River Alexander – actor
Shaun Anderson – professional baseball player
Brandon Barriera professional baseball player
 Andrea Berger (born 1970), tennis player
Kenny Boynton – professional basketball player
Brian Burns – professional football player
Tyson Campbell – college football cornerback
Triston Casas – professional baseball player
Jakob Chychrun – professional ice hockey player
Zack Collins – professional baseball player
Nick Eubanks - professional football player
Khalil Herbert – college football running back
Eric Hosmer – professional baseball player
James Houston IV — professional football player
Jonathan India — professional baseball player
Greg Joseph - football placekicker 
Deven Marrero – professional baseball player
Tarvarus McFadden – professional football player
Isaiah McKenzie – professional football player and co-owner of La Traila Barbecue
Camila Mendes – actress, Veronica Lodge on Riverdale
Marken Michel - football player
Sony Michel – football player, running back
Adrian Nieto – former professional baseball player
Dean Pelman (born 1995) – Israeli-American professional baseball player
Carlos PenaVega – actor
Antoan Richardson – Major League Baseball player and coach
Anthony Schwartz – college football wide receiver
Tedarrell Slaton - professional football player
Zandy Soree - college and professional soccer midfielder
Patrick Surtain Jr. - cornerback
Mark Vientos (born 1999) - professional baseball player for the New York Mets
David Villar (born 1997) - baseball player for the San Francisco Giants 
Marco Wilson – college football cornerback

References

External links 

Private elementary schools in Florida
Private middle schools in Florida
Delray Beach, Florida
High schools in Broward County, Florida
Educational institutions established in 1965
Private high schools in Florida
Preparatory schools in Florida
Plantation, Florida
1965 establishments in Florida